The women's RS:X competition at the 2016 Summer Olympics in Rio de Janeiro took place between 8–14 August at Marina da Glória. Thirteen races (the last one a medal race) were scheduled and completed.

The medals were presented by Barbara Kendall, IOC member, New Zealand and Nazli Imre, Vice President of World Sailing.

Schedule

Results

Further reading

References 

 

Women's RS:X
RS:X
Olym
Women's events at the 2016 Summer Olympics